Lago Arancio (Italian for "orange tree lake" ) is a lake in the Province of Agrigento, Sicily, Italy. The reservoir is located on the territory of the municipalities of Sambuca di Sicilia, Santa Margherita di Belice and Sciacca.

The ruins of the Fortino di Mazzallakkar are located near the lake, and are sometimes partially submerged by its waters.

References

Lakes of Sicily
Lago Arancio
Santa Margherita di Belice